Francis M. "Fran" Ryder (born 1954) is an Irish former Gaelic footballer and coach who played at club level with Ballymun Kickhams and St Vincent's and at inter-county level with the Dublin senior football team. He usually lined out as a centre-back.

Playing career

Ryder began his club career with Ballymun Kickhams before later transferring to St Vincent's. It was with the latter club that he won the All-Ireland Club Championship in 1976. Ryder was a member of the Dublin minor football team, and later won consecutive Leinster Under-21 Championship titles. He was drafted onto the Dublin senior football team in March 1974. Ryder went on to play in six consecutive All-Ireland finals, with victories as a substitute in 1974 and 1977, while his only winners' medal came on the field of play in 1976. His other honours include two National Football League titles.

Coaching career

Ryder spent five years as coach, and later selector, with the Dublin senior team from 1990 to 1995. In that period, Dublin won four consecutive Leinster Championships and the All-Ireland Championship title in 1995.

Honours

Player

St Vincent's
All-Ireland Senior Club Football Championship: 1976
Leinster Senior Club Football Championship: 1975
Dublin Senior Football Championship: 1975, 1976, 1977, 1981

Dublin
All-Ireland Senior Football Championship: 1974, 1976, 1977
Leinster Senior Football Championship: 1974, 1975, 1976, 1977, 1978, 1979
National Football League: 1975–76, 1977–78
Leinster Under-21 Football Championship: 1974, 1975

Coach

Dublin
All-Ireland Senior Football Championship: 1995
Leinster Senior Football Championship: 1992, 1993, 1994, 1995
National Football League: 1990–91, 1992–93

References

1954 births
Living people
Ballymun Kickhams Gaelic footballers
St Vincents (Dublin) Gaelic footballers
Dublin inter-county Gaelic footballers
Winners of three All-Ireland medals (Gaelic football)
Gaelic football coaches